Jojo Mason (born February 26, 1990) is a Canadian country music singer-songwriter. Mason moved to Victoria, British Columbia in 2004 to play hockey at the junior (Saanich Jr Braves, VIJHL) ranks but suffered a herniated disk. Later, he met songwriter/producer Dan Swinimer and worked on developing his vocals. He signed to Manicdown Productions in 2014 and released his debut single, "It's All Good", in early 2015. It reached the top 10 on the Billboard Canada Country chart. Mason's second single, "Good Kinda Love", was released in November 2015. He signed to 604 Records for the release of his third single, "Red Dress", in May 2016.

Discography

Albums

Extended plays

Singles

Christmas singles

Music videos

Awards and nominations

References

1990 births
Canadian country singer-songwriters
Canadian male singer-songwriters
Living people
Musicians from Regina, Saskatchewan
21st-century Canadian male singers